This is a list of orders of battle, which list the known military units that were located within the field of operations for a battle or campaign. The battles are listed in chronological order by starting date (or planned start date).

Classical period

Early modern period

1792–1860

American Civil War

1866–1913

World War I

Inter-war period

World War II

Modern era

Others

See also

References

External links
  World History Database, Alphabetic Listing of Battles Index of World battles.
  Radford, Robert, Great Historical Battles.  An extensive list of important battles and influential leaders, from −490 BC to  present times.

 
Lists of battles
Military lists
 
 
History-related lists
21st-century military history